Nushad Golaban may refer to:

Nushad Golaban 1
Nushad Golaban 2